Aaron Feltham (born April 16, 1982, in Goderich, Ontario) is a Canadian water polo player.

Feltham's professional career began at the age of 16, when he left home to play for the Ottawa Titans. Feltham played two years apiece with the Canada B water polo team and the junior national team. In 2007-08, he played in the top men's division in Hungary with Brendon ZF UPC Eger. In 2008, he was part of the Canada men's national water polo team, which took 11th out of 12 positions at the 2008 Summer Olympics. Most recently, Feltham plays professionally as a driver and hole checker for the club team Egri Vízilabda Klub in Eger, Hungary.

References
Aaron Feltham at NBColympics.com

External links

  (archive)
 
 

1982 births
Aquatic sportspeople from Ontario
Canadian male water polo players
Living people
Olympic water polo players of Canada
People from Goderich, Ontario
Water polo players at the 2007 Pan American Games
Water polo players at the 2008 Summer Olympics
Water polo players at the 2011 Pan American Games
Pan American Games silver medalists for Canada
Pan American Games bronze medalists for Canada
Pan American Games medalists in water polo
Medalists at the 2011 Pan American Games
20th-century Canadian people
21st-century Canadian people